The 1979–80 Illinois Fighting Illini men's basketball team represented the University of Illinois.

Regular season
For the 1979-80 season, head coach Lou Henson returned everyone from a team that finished with 19 wins.  The team gave the head coach his first of 11, 20-win seasons at Illinois. That year, Illinois made its first postseason appearance since 1963, finishing third in the NIT.  During the course of the season, the Illini would defeat eventual NCAA Tournament Champion, Louisville

Roster

Source

Schedule

Source

|-
!colspan=12 style="background:#DF4E38; color:white;"| Non-Conference regular season

|-
!colspan=9 style="background:#DF4E38; color:#FFFFFF;"|Big Ten regular season

|-
!colspan=9 style="text-align: center; background:#DF4E38"|National Invitation Tournament

|-

Player stats

Awards and honors
 Eddie Johnson
Fighting Illini All-Century team (2005)
Team Most Valuable Player

Team players drafted into the NBA

Rankings

References

Illinois
Illinois
Illinois Fighting Illini men's basketball seasons
Illinois
Illinois